Weldon Nathaniel Edwards (January 25, 1788 – December 18, 1873) was a Congressional Representative from North Carolina (1816 – 1827).

Early life
Edwards was born in 1788 in Gaston, North Carolina. He has attended Warrenton Academy where he studied law and was admitted to the bar in 1810 commencing practice in Warrenton, North Carolina.

Political career

State house of representatives
Edwards was member of the State house of representatives in 1814 and 1815.

Congressional career
Edwards served from February 7, 1816, to March 3, 1827 in the United States House of Representatives.
He was elected as a Republican to the Fourteenth Congress to fill the vacancy caused by the resignation of Nathaniel Macon, was reelected as a Republican to the Fifteenth, Sixteenth, and Seventeenth Congresses, elected as a Crawford Republican to the Eighteenth Congress, and as a Jacksonian to the Nineteenth Congress.

Edwards was chairman of the Committee on Expenditures in the Department of the Treasury (Eighteenth Congress), Committee on Public Expenditures (Nineteenth Congress). He declined to be a candidate for reelection in 1826 and chose to return to his plantation instead.

North Carolina Senate
He was a member of the State senate between 1833–1844. In 1835 he was a member of the State constitutional convention. Edwards was reelected to the State senate in 1850 and chosen its speaker.

He was president of the State secession convention in 1861.

Death
Edwards died in Warren County, North Carolinaon December 18, 1873  interred in a private cemetery at his home, "Poplar Mount," about twelve miles from Warrenton, Warren County, North Carolina.

See also 
 Fourteenth United States Congress
 Fifteenth United States Congress
 Sixteenth United States Congress
 Seventeenth United States Congress
 Eighteenth United States Congress
 Nineteenth United States Congress

References

 U.S. Congress Biographical Directory entry
 North Carolina Historical Marker

1788 births
1873 deaths
People from Gaston, North Carolina
Members of the North Carolina House of Representatives
North Carolina state senators
Democratic-Republican Party members of the United States House of Representatives from North Carolina
Jacksonian members of the United States House of Representatives from North Carolina
19th-century American politicians